St. Regis Lake is the name of two lakes on the St. Regis River in the Adirondack Mountains: 
 Upper St. Regis Lake
 Lower St. Regis Lake

See also 
 Saint Regis Pond